Volcanism on the Moon is represented by the presence of volcanoes, pyroclastic deposits and vast lava plains on the lunar surface. The volcanoes are typically in the form of small domes and cones that form large volcanic complexes and isolated edifices. Calderas, large-scale collapse features generally formed late in a volcanic eruptive episode, are exceptionally rare on the Moon. Lunar pyroclastic deposits are the result of lava fountain eruptions from volatile-laden basaltic magmas rapidly ascending from deep mantle sources and erupting as a spray of magma, forming tiny glass beads. However, pyroclastic deposits formed by less common non-basaltic explosive eruptions are also thought to exist on the Moon. Lunar lava plains cover large swaths of the Moon's surface and consist mainly of voluminous basaltic flows. They contain a number of volcanic features related to the cooling of lava, including lava tubes, rilles and wrinkle ridges.

The Moon has been volcanically active throughout much of its history, with the first volcanic eruptions having occurred about 4.2 billion years ago. Volcanism was most intense between 3.8 and 3 billion years ago, during which time much of the lunar lava plains were created. This activity was originally thought to have petered out about 1 billion years ago, but more recent evidence suggests that smaller-scale volcanism may have occurred in the last 50 million years. Today, the Moon has no active volcanoes even though a significant amount of magma may persist under the lunar surface.

Early impressions
In 1610, Italian astronomer Galileo Galilei misinterpreted the lunar lava plains as seas while observing the Moon through the world's first telescope. Galilei therefore dubbed them maria after the Latin word for "seas". The bowl-shaped depressions distributed throughout the lunar landscape were first suggested to be volcanoes in 1665 by British chemist Robert Hooke. Their volcanic origin was bolstered by their similarity to the Phlegraean Fields craters in Italy, although much larger. French astronomer Pierre Puiseux proposed that the Moon's craters were collapsed volcanic domes that had vented all their gases. Pierre-Simon Laplace, another French astronomer, proposed in the 18th century that meteorites were volcanic projectiles ejected from lunar craters during major eruptions. British astronomer William Herschel, in one of his early papers, claimed to have seen three volcanoes on the Moon in the late 1700s, which later turned out to be earthshine.

The origin of lunar craters remained controversial throughout the first half of the 20th century, with volcano supporters arguing that bright rays fanning out of some craters were streaks of volcanic ash similar to those found at Mount Aso in Japan. Astronomers also reported flashes of light and red clouds over the Alphonsus and Aristarchus craters. Evidence collected during the Apollo program (1961–1972) and from unmanned spacecraft of the same period proved conclusively that meteoric impact, or impact by asteroids for larger craters, was the origin of almost all lunar craters, and by implication, most craters on other bodies as well.

Features
After impact cratering, volcanism is the most dominant process that has modified the lunar crust. Much of this modification has been preserved due to the lack of plate tectonics on the Moon, such that the lunar surface has changed insignificantly throughout the Moon's geological history. Lunar volcanism has mostly been confined to the near side of the Moon where basaltic lava plains are the dominant volcanic feature. In contrast, positive topographic features such as domes, cones and shields represent only a tiny fraction of the lunar volcanic record. Volcanoes and lava plains have been found on both sides of the Moon.

Lava plains

The lunar maria are large basaltic plains that cover more than 15% of the Moon's surface. They are the most obvious volcanic features on the Moon, appearing as dark topographic features when seen with the naked eye. Many tend to cover the floors of large impact basins and are therefore typically circular in outline, with some smaller maria filling the bottoms of impact craters. This suggests that each mare is the product of several overlapping eruptive events.

The ages of the mare basalts have been determined both by direct radiometric dating and by the technique of crater counting. The radiometric ages range from about 3.16 to 4.2 billion years, whereas the youngest ages determined from crater counting are about 1.2 billion years. Nevertheless, the majority of mare basalts appear to have erupted between about 3 and 3.5 billion years ago. The few basaltic eruptions that occurred on the far side of the Moon are old, whereas the youngest flows are found within Oceanus Procellarum on the near side. While many of the basalts either erupted within, or flowed into, low-lying impact basins, the largest expanse of volcanic units, Oceanus Procellarum, does not correspond to any known impact basin.

The reason that the mare basalts are predominantly located on the near-side hemisphere of the Moon is still being debated by the scientific community. Based on data obtained from the Lunar Prospector mission, it appears that a large proportion of the Moon's inventory of heat producing elements (in the form of KREEP) is located within the regions of Oceanus Procellarum and the Imbrium basin, a unique geochemical province now referred to as the Procellarum KREEP Terrane. While the enhancement in heat production within the Procellarum KREEP Terrane is most certainly related to the longevity and intensity of volcanism found there, the mechanism by which KREEP became concentrated within this region is not agreed upon.

Examples

Volcanoes

A number of domes and cones are present on the Moon, but such features likely formed differently than those on Earth. Because gravity on the Moon is only one sixth of that on Earth, lunar volcanism is capable of throwing ejecta much further, leaving little to pile up near the vent. Instead of a volcanic cone, such lunar eruptions should form a broad, thin layer around the vent. On Earth, lava domes form from very viscous, pasty lavas. Basaltic lavas are more liquid and tend to form broad, flat lava flows. On the Moon, most of the domes and cones appear to be made of basalts. As a result, they are unlikely to have formed like Earth domes from thick, non-basaltic lavas. Instead, the lunar domes and cones may mark places where the erupted basalts were just barely molten.

Lunar domes are seldom found in isolation. Instead, they more commonly form in groups throughout the lunar lava plains. A prominent example are the Marius Hills, one of the largest volcanic complexes on the Moon. They consist of several cones and domes that occupy the summit of a broad topographic swell, which may be the lunar equivalent of a shield volcano. The complex rises  from the surrounding plains and forms a  lava plateau. A total of 59 cones and 262 domes ranging in diameter from  have been identified.

Mons Rümker is a smaller complex similar in appearance to the Marius Hills. Three main basalt units ranging in age from 3.51 to 3.71 billion years have been identified at Mons Rümker, although the youngest volcanic features may be steep-sided domes on the plateau surface as they show indications of having been active until the Eratosthenian. More than 20 domes overlie the plateau and are the most prominent volcanic landforms of Mons Rümker.

The Gruithuisen Domes in northwestern Mare Imbrium consist of two volcanic edifices: Mons Gruithuisen Gamma to the north and Mons Gruithuisen Delta to the south. They are situated on the rim of an impact crater and differ in color from the surrounding rocks. The domes may mark a rare instance of non-basaltic volcanism on the Moon. Mons Hansteen, a roughly triangular-shaped dome on the southern margin of Oceanus Procellerum, is another example of a rare non-basaltic lunar volcano. It consists of high-silica material that was erupted roughly 3.5 to 3.7 billion years ago from vents along northeast, northwest and southwest-trending fractures. 

It differs from other lunar volcanic features due to its evolved lithology, regional tectonic setting, its location being near the north pole, far from the Procellarum KREEP Terrane and its recent association with endogenic water. In the middle of the CBVC lies an irregular-shaped depression bounded by fault scarps that is believed to be a caldera. A volcanic cone-like feature, called East Dome, lies near the eastern caldera margin. Just north of the caldera is a feature called Little Dome,  in diameter. Further north is an elongated dome, oriented north–south, called Middle Dome. Both Little Dome and Middle Dome have boulders on top that may be volcanic blocks. Big Dome, also known as North Dome, is further to the north at the edge of the CBVC. Small-crater size frequency distribution has given inconclusive results for the timing of CBVC volcanism, with ages ranging from less than 1 billion years to greater than 3 billion years.

Lava tubes

Although lava tubes have long been known to exist on Earth, it has only been relatively recently that they have been confirmed to also exist on the Moon. Their existence is sometimes revealed by the presence of a "skylight", a place in which the roof of the tube has collapsed, leaving a circular hole that can be observed by lunar orbiters. An area displaying a lava tube is the Marius Hills region. In 2008, an opening to a lava tube in this area may have been discovered by the Japanese Kaguya spacecraft. There may also be lava tubes in the Mare Serenitatis. 

Lunar lava tubes may potentially serve as enclosures for human habitats. These natural tunnels provide protection from cosmic radiation, solar radiation, meteorites, micrometeorites, and ejecta from impacts. They are insulated from the extreme temperature variations on the lunar surface and could provide a stable environment for inhabitants.

Pyroclastic deposits

Near the edges of the lunar mare are dark layers of material that cover many thousands of square kilometers. They contain many small spheres of orange and black glass that probably formed from small drops of lava that cooled very quickly. Such droplets are believed to be ejecta from lava fountain eruptions that were larger than those on Earth. The largest known deposits occur at Taurus–Littrow, Sinus Aestuum, Sulpicius Gallus, Rima Bode, Mare Vaporum, Mare Humorum and the Aristarchus plateau in the central near side of the Moon.

Many smaller pyroclastic deposits measure only a few kilometers in diameter and are almost always located near the mare or in large impact crater floors, although several also lie along clear fault lines. They were likely produced by small volcanic explosions since most contain a small elongated or irregular-shaped central pit or crater. Examples are preserved along the crater floor edge of Alphonsus, an impact crater on the eastern edge of Mare Nubium.

Its reflectivity is stronger in the  range, indicating that quartz or alkali feldspar is the major constituent. The large extent of this pyroclastic deposit is due to the Moon's low gravity, such that a giant explosive eruption from the CBVC was able to spread debris over an area much greater than would be possible on Earth.

Rilles

These are long, narrow depressions in the lunar surface that resemble channels. Their precise formation remains to be determined, but they were likely formed by different processes. For instance, sinuous rilles meander in a curved path like a mature river and are thought to represent lava channels or the remains of collapsed lava tubes. They normally extend from small pit structures that are believed to have been volcanic vents. Schroter's Valley between Mare Imbrium and Oceanus Procellarum is the largest sinuous rille. Another prominent example is Rima Hadley, which formed nearly 3.3 billion years ago. 

Arcuate rilles have a smooth curve and are found on the edges of the dark lunar maria. They are believed to have formed when the lava flows that created a mare cooled, contracted and sank. These are found all over the Moon; prominent examples can be seen near the southwestern border of Mare Tranquillitatis and on the western southeastern border of Mare Humorum.

Impacts
Analysis of Moon magma samples retrieved by the Apollo missions indicate that volcanism on the Moon produced a relatively thick lunar atmosphere for a period of 70 million years between 3 and 4 billion years ago. This atmosphere, sourced from gases ejected from lunar volcanic eruptions, was twice the thickness of that of present-day Mars. It has been theorized, in fact, that this ancient atmosphere could have supported life, though no evidence of life has been found. The ancient lunar atmosphere was eventually stripped away by solar winds and dissipated into space. 

Partial melting of the lunar mantle and the emplacement of Oceanus Procellarum flood basalts may have caused axial tilting of the Moon 3 billion years ago, during which time the lunar poles shifted  to their modern positions. This polar wander is inferred from polar hydrogen deposits that are antipodal and displaced equally from each pole along opposite longitudes.

Recent activity
In 2014, NASA announced "widespread evidence of young lunar volcanism" at 70 irregular mare patches identified by the Lunar Reconnaissance Orbiter, some less than 50 million years old. This raises the possibility of a much warmer lunar mantle than previously estimated, at least on the near side where the deep crust is substantially warmer because of the greater concentration of radioactive elements. Just prior to this, evidence has been presented for 2–10 million years younger basaltic volcanism inside the crater Lowell, located in the transition zone between the near and far sides of the Moon. An initially hotter mantle and/or local enrichment of heat-producing elements in the mantle could be responsible for prolonged activities also on the far side in the Orientale basin. There are currently no active volcanoes on the Moon, although moonquake data published in 2012 suggest that there is a substantial amount of magma under the lunar surface. The lack of active volcanism on the Moon may be due to the magma being too dense to rise to the surface.

See also

List of extraterrestrial volcanoes
Geology of the Moon
Lunar magma ocean
Volcanism on Io

References

 
Pre-Nectarian
Nectarian
Imbrian
Eratosthenian